One drop may refer to:

 One Drop Foundation, a non-profit organization that advocates for equal access to water
 Big One for One Drop, a poker tournament featuring the largest buy-in events
 One drop rhythm, a rhythmic pattern used in reggae music and related styles
 One-drop rule, a law in the south of the USA before the USA Civil War that stated that a person with any African ancestry was considered black

Songs
 "One Drop" (Bob Marley & The Wailers song)
 "One Drop" (KAT-TUN song)
 "One Drop", a 2012 single by Public Image Ltd.
 "One Drop", a song by Plumb on Need You Now (Plumb album)